is a Japanese josei manga series by Yumi Unita. It was serialized in the monthly magazine Feel Young from October 2005 to April 2011, collected into nine wide-ban volumes by Shodensha. An anime adaptation by Production I.G aired in Japan between July and September 2011. A live-action film was also made and premiered in Japan on August 20, 2011. A spin-off series, also by Unita, entitled Usagi Drop: Bangaihen was serialized in Feel Young from July to December 2011 and collected in one volume. The series has been licensed in English by Yen Press, with the tenth and final volume released on April 22, 2014. The plot follows thirty-year-old Daikichi as he becomes the guardian of Rin, the illegitimate six-year-old daughter of his grandfather.

Volume list

References

Bunny Drop